Raymond Victor Franz (May 8, 1922 – June 2, 2010) was a member of the Governing Body of Jehovah's Witnesses from October 20, 1971, until his removal on May 22, 1980, and served at the organization's world headquarters for fifteen years, from 1965 until 1980. Franz stated the request for his resignation and his subsequent disfellowshipping resulted from allegations of apostasy. Following his removal, Franz wrote two books that related his personal experiences with the Watch Tower Bible and Tract Society and his views on Jehovah's Witnesses teachings.

Watch Tower career

Franz was born in 1922. His uncle, Frederick Franz, was influential in the denomination's development, practices and doctrines. His father associated with the Bible Student movement (from which Jehovah's Witnesses developed) and was baptized in 1913. Franz joined the Jehovah's Witnesses in 1938, and became a baptized member in 1939. 

In 1944, Franz graduated from Gilead, the group's school for training missionaries, and temporarily served the organization as a traveling representative in the continental United States until receiving a missionary assignment to Puerto Rico in 1946. Franz became a representative of Jehovah's Witnesses throughout the Caribbean, traveling to the Virgin Islands and the Dominican Republic, until at least 1957 when Jehovah's Witnesses were banned in the Dominican Republic by dictator Rafael Trujillo. At the age of 37, Franz married his wife, Cynthia, who joined him on missionary work. Both returned to the Dominican Republic in 1961 to evangelize for four more years and were then assigned to Watch Tower headquarters in Brooklyn, New York. 

According to Franz, he began working in the organization's writing department and was assigned to collaboratively write Aid to Bible Understanding, the first religious encyclopedia published by Jehovah's Witnesses. On October 20, 1971, he was appointed as a member of the Governing Body. In his personal memoir, Franz said that at the end of 1979 he reached a personal crossroad: 

Frustrated by what he viewed as the Governing Body's dogmatism and overemphasis on traditional views rather than reliance on the Bible in reaching doctrinal decisions, Franz and his wife decided in late 1979 they would leave the international headquarters.

Expulsion

In March 1980, Franz and his wife took a leave of absence from the world headquarters for health reasons and moved to Alabama, where he took up laboring work on a property owned by a fellow Witness. The following month, a committee of the Governing Body raised concerns about "wrong teachings" being spread by headquarters staff and began questioning staff about their beliefs. Staff were also questioned about comments Franz had made that may have contradicted Watch Tower doctrine. The March 15, 1980, issue of The Watchtower issued a statement of regret that its assertions of probability of Armageddon arriving before 1975 had "apparently overshadowed the cautionary ones and contributed to a buildup of expectation already initiated." It told disappointed Jehovah's Witnesses, "including persons having to do with the publication of the information that contributed to the buildup of hopes centred on that date" to "concentrate on adjusting his viewpoint". This statement, which placed blame for the disappointment about 1975 on Raymond Franz as the former chairman of the writing committee, precipitated a purge of that committee. On May 8, 1980, Franz was told that he had been implicated as an apostate. He was called back to Brooklyn on May 20 for two days of questioning by the Chairman's Committee. According to Franz, the discussion involved allegations that some Witnesses were meeting privately to discuss various teachings of the Watch Tower Society that may have constituted apostasy.

On May 21, 1980, Franz was called to a Governing Body session where he was questioned for three hours about his biblical viewpoints and commitment to Watch Tower doctrines. Consequently, he agreed to a request to resign from the Governing Body and headquarters staff. Franz refused the Watch Tower Society's offer of a monthly stipend as a member of the "Infirm Special Pioneers". The Governing Body investigation resulted in the disfellowshipping of several other headquarters staff.

On September 1, 1980, the Governing Body distributed a letter to all Circuit and District overseers stating that apostates need not be promoting doctrines to be disfellowshipped. The letter stated that individuals who persisted in "believing other doctrine despite scriptural reproof" were also apostatizing and therefore warranted "appropriate judicial action".

On March 18, 1981, Franz' employer in Alabama submitted a letter of disassociation from Jehovah's Witnesses. The September 15, 1981, issue of The Watchtower announced a change of policy on disassociation, directing that those who formally withdrew from the group were to be shunned by Witnesses in the same manner as those who have been disfellowshipped. Franz, who continued to socialize with his employer, was summoned to a judicial hearing on November 25 and disfellowshipped for disobeying the edict. Determined to present his point of view, not only with respect to his having been disfellowshipped, but with respect to broader doctrinal issues, in 1982 he sent Heather and Gary Botting proofs of his book Crisis of Conscience so that they could chronicle the more widespread discord within the Watch Tower Society. They wrote regarding Franz' contribution to their exposé on the Witnesses that his recommendations "undoubtedly strengthened the veracity of the text; we were impressed by his insistence on both fairness and frankness with respect to representing the view of the Watch Tower Society." After he was disfellowshipped, Franz published two books—Crisis of Conscience (1983) and In Search of Christian Freedom (1991)—presenting detailed accounts of his experiences as a Jehovah's Witness, a Governing Body member, and his experiences throughout various levels of the organization.

Death
On May 30, 2010, at age 88, Franz fell and suffered a brain hemorrhage. He died on June 2, 2010.

See also
Jehovah's Witnesses and congregational discipline

References

Bibliography

External links
 .

1922 births
2010 deaths
People disfellowshipped by the Jehovah's Witnesses
Members of the Governing Body of Jehovah's Witnesses
Critics of Jehovah's Witnesses
Former Jehovah's Witnesses